The Way Things Work was a short-lived children`s television series based on the best-selling book of the same name by David Macaulay. The series was co-produced by Millimages, Pearson Broadband, and Schlessinger Media; it was distributed by the latter. The program ran daily on BBC2 and CBBC from 2001 to early 2002, before it was discontinued due to a lack of both episodes and audience. The series (hand-animated) was one of the last few educational TV programmes still shown by the BBC on CBBC. It is one of its most short-lived television series, running for only 26 15-minute episodes. The programme aims to teach basic principles of science to young viewers and revolves around the residents of the backward Mammoth Island as they struggle through daily life with the use of outlandish contraptions. The series was later dubbed into French and briefly aired in syndication on TV network France 5. A DVD containing all 26 episodes of the series was released in 2005.

Concept 

Due to the popularity of the book The Way Things Work by David Macaulay, Millimages pitched a concept for an educational television series with similar features to Schlessinger Media, who accepted the idea and agreed to distribute the programme to the BBC upon completion. Animation began in 1999, but the programme was not first aired until 2001, on both BBC2 and CBBC. The programme had a very short lifespan; it consisted of 26 episodes, each attempting to educate children about basic science, of 15 minutes each. Millimages had plans for a second series, but the programme was promptly discontinued, as it was not attracting enough audiences. It was one of the last hand-animated programmes on the BBC. The show takes features from the book, such as the constant abuse of the Woolly Mammoth, and the detailed and colourful explanations of the machines. Each episode focuses on a different area of science. The programme's plot was debated, before finally deciding on an island (later to be renamed Mammoth Island) on which the inhabitants build outlandish contraptions to make their lives easier.

Characters 

The programme consisted of six main characters, all of whom appeared in every episode of the programme.

The Inventor: A middle-aged man on temporary vacation to Mammoth Island. Throughout the series, he was never named. He is responsible for the construction of the machines on Mammoth Island, and is always presenting labour-saving apparatus, which often caused difficulties of its own. Voiced by Dan Russell.

Olive: The Inventor's closest friend. Aged 14, she has a very inquisitive mind, and often appears cleverer than the Inventor. Voiced by Ellie Fairman.

Troy: Olive's cousin, who relies mostly on his own strength and those of the woolly mammoths, and is sometimes gullible. Voiced by Bob Saker.

Frank: Pilbeam's brother and Olive's father, who takes charge of building the Inventor's inventions. Voiced by Keith Wickham.

Pilbeam: Troy's father; married to Brenda. Although he is Frank's brother, he lives separately from him and is often unsure of Frank's plans, and is known to quarrel with his wife. Voiced by Keith Wickham.

Brenda: Troy's mother, married to Pilbeam. She is strictly opposed to the Inventors' ideas, and often argues with her husband. Voiced by Caroline Bernstein.

Episodes

Reception 

The series was released on the BBC to general acclaim; however, late into its airing, the BBC believed that it had not been as popular as they thought it would, and, by early 2002, the show had been discontinued before Millimage's plans of a second series could be carried through. However, Millimages still went on to release a DVD of the existing 26 episodes in 2005.
The series won a Gold World Award for Children's Programming at the New York Festival 2004.

References

External links
 
 The Way Things Work, Big Cartoon Database
 The Way Things Work Video Series, Library Video Company

2001 British television series debuts
British children's animated science fiction television series
2002 British television series endings